Türkentor (Turks' Gate) may refer to one of two buildings in Germany:
Türkentor (Helmstedt)
Türkentor (Munich)